Pedro M. Pancho (born July 2, 1934) is a Filipino politician. He has been elected to five terms as a Member of the House of Representatives of the Philippines, representing the 2nd District of Bulacan from 1992 to 2001 and from 2004 to 2013.

References
 

People from Bulacan
1934 births
Living people
Members of the House of Representatives of the Philippines from Bulacan
Lakas–CMD (1991) politicians
Lakas–CMD politicians
Pwersa ng Masang Pilipino politicians
National Unity Party (Philippines) politicians